The Brennan Center for Justice at New York University School of Law (NYU Law) is a nonprofit law and public policy institute. The organization is named after Supreme Court Justice William J. Brennan Jr. Generally considered liberal, the Brennan Center advocates for a number of progressive public policy positions, including raising the minimum wage, opposing voter ID laws, and calling for public funding of elections. The organization opposed the U.S. Supreme Court's ruling in Citizens United v. FEC, which held that the First Amendment prohibits the government from restricting independent political expenditures by nonprofits.

The organization's stated mission is to "work to hold our political institutions and laws accountable to the twin American ideals of democracy and equal justice for all." Its president is Michael Waldman, former speechwriter for President Bill Clinton.

History and mission
The Brennan Center for Justice was founded in 1995 by the family and former law clerks of Supreme Court Justice William J. Brennan Jr., whom The Washington Post called "the progressive voice of the modern court". Justice Brennan's idea of a living constitution figures largely into the center's work. The Brennan Center started with an initial grant by the Carnegie Corporation of New York of $25,000 in 1996. The Carnegie Corporation in years since has donated over $3,650,000. During the selection process of what school to center operations from, the Brennan Center selected NYU Law out of a choice of three schools, with the other two being Harvard University and Georgetown University.

The Brennan Center is part think tank, part public interest law firm, and part advocacy group. The organization is involved in issues such as opposing voter ID laws that it believes unduly restrict voter registration, and other barriers to registration and voting, and advocates for redistricting reform and campaign finance reform.

Activities
The Brennan Center's work is divided into three programs—Democracy, Justice, and Liberty & National Security. Past programs focused on criminal justice, poverty, and economic justice. The organization has focus on issues both at the national level in the United States but also at the state and local levels of government.

The Brennan Center opposes mass incarceration and produces research on causes of violent crime in the United States. The Brennan Center has represented several detainees at the Guantanamo Bay detention camp, and also U.S. citizens or legal residents held as unlawful enemy combatants. Attorneys from the Brennan Center challenged a U.S. President's authority to declare a prisoner to be an unlawful enemy combatant in the war on terror. They have also challenged the U.S. Congress's power to deny habeas corpus to such prisoners.

The Brennan Center assisted in drafting and enacting the Bipartisan Campaign Reform Act of 2002 (BCRA). The law banned soft money contributions to political campaigns. The organization helped Senator Dick Durbin write the Fair Elections Now Act.

The Brennan Center advocated for the passage in 2010 of New York's law ending prison-based gerrymandering, and was part of a coalition of organizations that sought to defend that law from a court challenge. The Brennan Center advocates for the restoration of felon voting rights.

The Brennan Center represented plaintiffs Margarita López Torres, other unsuccessful judicial candidates, and Common Cause, in a lawsuit that challenged the way New York state trial judge candidates gain access to the ballot. They prevailed in the U.S. District Court and in the U.S. Court of Appeals for the 2nd Circuit. In 2007, attorneys from the Brennan Center argued N.Y. State Bd. of Elections v. Lopez Torres before the United States Supreme Court. In 2008, the court ruled for the state.

In 2015, the Brennan Center submitted an amicus curiae brief with the Supreme Court of Wisconsin, urging the state not to overturn John Doe law, which allows the state to conduct criminal investigations in secret.

The Brennan Center has been tracking states' legislation on voter ID laws and other barriers to voter registration and voting to determine whether there is undue burden carried by certain communities. Numerous lawsuits have been brought against states in such cases. By August 1, 2016, rulings in five cases: Ohio, Texas, North Carolina, Wisconsin, and North Dakota, overturned certain voter ID and other provisions, requiring states to make alternatives acceptable for the November 2016 election cycle. The Brennan Center research has also indicated that instances of voter fraud by citizens and non-citizens is very rare.

The Brennan Center filed a friend of the court briefing in the U.S. Supreme Court in the case of Moore v. Harper. In oral arguments on December 7, 2022, the Brennan Center urged the United States Supreme Court to allow the North Carolina Supreme Court to strike down the state legislature’s congressional map for violating the North Carolina Constitution.

The Brennan Center for Justice is a partner organization of VoteRiders.

Funding 
As of the Brennan Center's 2021 annual report, the organization has received funding from:

See also
Alliance for Justice
American Constitution Society
Justice at Stake

References

External links
 

1995 establishments in New York City
Civil liberties advocacy groups in the United States
Election and voting-related organizations based in the United States
Elections in the United States
New York University
New York University research institutes
Non-profit organizations based in New York City
Organizations established in 1995
Progressive organizations in the United States